Pliosteostoma lutipinnis, the yellowfin herring, is a longfin herring that is found along the coast of Central and South America from Mexico to Ecuador. It is the only species in its genus.

References

Pristigasteridae
Monotypic ray-finned fish genera
Fish of Central America
Fish of South America
Taxa named by John Roxborough Norman
Fish described in 1923